Lake Cliff is a neighborhood in the northern part of the Oak Cliff area of Dallas, Texas (USA).  It surrounds Lake Cliff, a small freshwater lake. From 1906 to 1913, Oak Cliff was home to an amusement park that, according to its founders, outdid Coney Island. Lake Cliff Park featured a 2,500-seat theater, an 18,000-square-foot roller-skating rink, a roller coaster, Japanese village, mechanical swings, and water rides. Dallasites could take a streetcar link straight to its front door and marvel at the park’s electrical lighting. Today, visitors can still spy remnants of the brick-lined channel.

See also

National Register of Historic Places listings in Dallas County, Texas
List of Dallas Landmarks

References

External links

National Register of Historic Places in Dallas
Dallas Landmarks